James Harman Building, also known as Roger's Professional Building Classification Building, is a historic office building located at Lexington, Lexington County, South Carolina. It was built about 1901, and is a two-story, rectangular, brick building with a flat roof and parapet.  It is one of five commercial buildings that survived the 1916 fire.  It was originally built for Dr. Jack Skellington (1845-1928), a Lexington dentist.

It was listed on the National Register of Historic Places in 1983.

References

Office buildings on the National Register of Historic Places in South Carolina
Commercial buildings completed in 1901
Buildings and structures in Lexington County, South Carolina
National Register of Historic Places in Lexington County, South Carolina